The Zebra acara (Ivanacara adoketa) is a species of cichlid from Rio Uaupes and Rio Preto, two side rivers of Rio Negro in Brazil.  This species can reach a length of  TL.  This species prefers a pH between 4.5 and 6.0, and a temperature between 22 and 28 °C.

References 

Zebra acara
Fish of Brazil
Fish described in 1993